Dougie Robertson (born  in Torphichen West Lothian is a Scottish former professional football player who is best known for his time with Greenock Morton.

Robertson began his career with Polbeth United Boys Club before joining Rangers. Whilst at Ibrox he made eighteen appearances. He left in 1983 to join Greenock Morton, where he would spend the majority of his career, making close to 200 appearances for the club. A brief spell with Falkirk in 1989 was followed by a return to Greenock before retiring in 1990.

Personal life

Robertson's son David was a professional footballer, who also played for Morton.

References

External links

1963 births
Living people
Footballers from West Lothian
Rangers F.C. players
Greenock Morton F.C. players
Association football forwards
Falkirk F.C. players
Scottish footballers
Scottish Football League players